= Gandhi International Airport =

Gandhi International Airport may refer to either of two international airports in India:

- Indira Gandhi International Airport, serving the National Capital Region of Delhi, located in Palam
- Rajiv Gandhi International Airport, serving the metropolis of Hyderabad, located in Shamshabad
